Woman of Words is a statue of Katherine Mansfield located in Midland Park on Lambton Quay, Wellington, New Zealand, and honours the life of New Zealand writer Katherine Mansfield.

The statue project was a joint commission between the Wellington Sculpture Trust, the Katherine Mansfield Society and the Wellington City Council. Part of the funding was provided by the Nikau Foundation, on behalf of the Richard and Doreen Evans Charitable Trust; other funding was provided by Apex Properties, Todd Corporation, Wellington Community Trust, Mark McGuiness and Jon Craig. It was unveiled in May 2013 by Wellington's Mayor, Celia Wade-Brown.

The statue is the work of New Zealand sculptor Virginia King. statue is made of stainless steel and embellished with words and from Mansfield's writing. At night the statue is lit up from inside.

References

Monuments and memorials to women
Buildings and structures in Wellington City
2013 sculptures
Mansfield, Katherine
Cultural depictions of New Zealand women
Outdoor sculptures in New Zealand
Statues in New Zealand
Statues of writers